Haeterius brunneipennis is a species in the family Histeridae ("clown beetles"), in the order Coleoptera ("beetles").
It is found in North America.

References

Further reading
 Arnett, R.H. Jr., M. C. Thomas, P. E. Skelley and J. H. Frank. (eds.). (2002). American Beetles, Volume II: Polyphaga: Scarabaeoidea through Curculionoidea. CRC Press LLC, Boca Raton, FL.
 Bousquet, Yves, and Serge Laplante (2006). "Coleoptera Histeridae". The Insects and Arachnids of Canada, part 24, xiii + 485.
 Richard E. White. (1983). Peterson Field Guides: Beetles. Houghton Mifflin Company.
 Ross H. Arnett. (2000). American Insects: A Handbook of the Insects of America North of Mexico. CRC Press.

Histeridae
Beetles described in 1838